The 2004–05 UPC-ligaen was the 66th season of Norway's premier ice hockey league, Eliteserien, which as of this season became known as the UPC-ligaen after UPC had acquired the naming rights for five years. Vålerenga won both the League Championship and the Norwegian Championship, completing their nineteenth "double". A total of ten teams contested the league, including newcomers Comet who competed at the highest level for the first time.

The regular season commenced on 19 September 2004 and concluded on 20 February 2005. Vålerenga clinched their twenty-fifth league title after winning 3–2 in overtime against the Sparta Warriors on 17 February. This left them with an unassailable lead of seven points over the Trondheim Black Panthers, with only one round left to play. The result also confirmed Trondheim as runners-up ahead of the Storhamar Dragons.

The playoffs to determine the 2005 Norwegian Ice Hockey Champions were contested from 22 February to 20 March 2005. Vålerenga were crowned champions for the twenty-third time after defeating Trondheim by 4 games to 1 in the best-of-seven Final.

Regular season

Final standings

GP = Games played; W = Wins; L = Losses; OTW = Overtime Wins; OTL = Overtime losses; SOW = Shootout Wins; SOL = Shootout losses; PCT = Percent of possible points; GF = Goals for; GA = Goals against; PIM = Penalties in minutes; Pts = Points; C = ChampionsSource: hockey.no

Statistics

Scoring leaders
The following players led the league in points at the conclusion of the regular season.
GP = Games played; G = Goals; A = Assists; Pts = Points; +/– = Plus/minus; PIM = Penalty minutes

Leading goaltenders
The following goaltenders led the league in goals against average at the conclusion of the regular season.
GP = Games played; TOI = Time on ice (minutes); W = Wins; L = Losses; GA = Goals against; SO = Shutouts; Sv% = Save percentage; GAA = Goals against average

Attendance

For the 2004–05 season, the league attendance totaled 292,711 spectators for an average of 1,394. This was a 9.3% increase from the previous season's total of 267,707 spectators and average of 1,275.

Playoffs

Bracket

Source: hockey.no

Qualifying for UPC-ligaen 2005–06

Final standings

GP = Games played; W = Wins; L = Losses; OTW = Overtime Wins; OTL = Overtime losses; SOW = Shootout Wins; SOL = Shootout losses; PCT = Percentage of possible points; GF = Goals for; GA = Goals against; PIM = Penalties in minutes; Pts = Points; Q = QualifiedSource: speaker.no

Game log

|Round 1

Round 2

Round 3

Round 4

Round 5

Round 6

Awards
All-Star team

The following players were selected to the 2004–05 UPC-ligaen All-Star team:
Goaltender: Chris Mason (Vålerenga)
Defenceman: Duane Harmer (Trondheim)
Defenceman: Anders Myrvold (Vålerenga)
Center: Ilya Dubkov (Trondheim)
Winger: Lars Erik Spets (Trondheim)
Winger: Nick Smith (Trondheim)

Other
Coach of the year: Tommy Sandlin (Trondheim)

References

2004–05
GET
Norway